Omar S. Ishrak (born 1955) is a Bangladeshi-American business executive, serving as the chairman of the board for Intel, since January 2020. He was previously the CEO and chairman of the board of Medtronic from June 2011 to April 2020, and remained as executive chairman and chairman of its board of directors until December 2020.

Biography
Ishrak was born and grew up in Bangladesh. He was a student of St Joseph Higher Secondary School in Dhaka. He studied at King's College London and was awarded a Bachelor of Science and a Doctor of Philosophy in electrical engineering from the University of London.

Before joining Medtronic, he served as the president and CEO of GE Healthcare Systems.

Omar has been a member of the Intel board of directors since March 2017. He was announced the independent chairman of its board in January 2020.

In 2020, Ishrak was elected as a member of the National Academy of Engineering for "contributions to diagnostic ultrasound and for leadership in medical technology innovation and globalization." In 2021 he joined Amgen's board of directors.

Personal life
He is married, and lives in Minneapolis.

References

Living people
Alumni of the University of London
Alumni of King's College London
Fellows of King's College London
1956 births